This Is Who I Am is the debut studio album by Trinidadian-American singer Heather Headley. It was released on October 8, 2002 by RCA Records. The album was certified gold by the Recording Industry Association of America (RIAA) on June 3, 2003, and has sold 677,000 copies in the United States.

Critical reception

John Bush from Allmusic found that "though she didn't come out of the R&B tradition, Heather Headley has plenty of soul on her debut, This Is Who I Am. Headley, a singer whose vocal strength isn't mere compensation for a lack of interpretive skills or lame songwriting, possesses a range that's surprising and welcome; she slips on dramatic personas continually here, quite ironic considering the title.."

Track listing

Personnel
Credits are taken from the album's liner notes.

Instruments and performances
Guitars: Dallas Austin, Terrence Elliot, Tomi Martin, Jeff Mironov
Bass: Steve Mostyn
Percussion: Steve Marston
Keyboards: Kwame Kwaten, Rob Mounsey, Michael Norfleet, Jeremy Ruzumna, James Wright
Rap: Chukki Starr

Technical and production
Engineered by: Wayne Allison, Anne Catalino, Mike Ging, Steve Hodge, Adam Kagan, Carlton Lynn, Chauncey Mahan, James Muller, Anthony Ruotolo, Rick Sheppard, Christine Sirois, Reed Vertelney, Bradley Yost, Andy Zulla
Mixed by: Dave Way, Steve Hodge, Andy Zulla, Chauncey Mahan

Charts

Weekly charts

Year-end charts

Certifications

Release history

References

2002 debut albums
Albums produced by Jimmy Jam and Terry Lewis
Albums with cover art by Tony Duran
Heather Headley albums
RCA Records albums